The Pontefract line is one of the rail services in the West Yorkshire Metro area of northern England. The service is operated by Northern, and links Wakefield and  Leeds with Goole via Pontefract. The Metro timetable for the line also includes services operated as the Dearne Valley line between York and Sheffield via Pontefract.

The line, which passes through the former mining areas to the east of Wakefield and Castleford, has the greatest number of stations opened by the West Yorkshire Metro. MetroCards are available on the route as far as Knottingley: a limited service of trains continues to Goole by this route.

The route

History
Railways in the area opened as follows:
 1 April 1848: the Wakefield, Pontefract and Goole Railway, 27 miles (43 km) in length, opened. This line passed through and served Knottingley, which was then producing some 65 000 tons of burnt lime a year, mainly used for agricultural and building purposes.
 February 1854 the Great Northern Railway (GNR) and Lancashire and Yorkshire Railway (L&YR) jointly administered Knottingley station.   
 August 1850: Knottingley to Burton Salmon line opened. Trains were able to run from London to York via Knottingley, which was the station to change to and from trains into the heart of the West Riding, and so it became a major junction. 
 May 1879: The Swinton and Knottingley Railway, connecting Sheffield and York via Pontefract, opened; Ferrybridge station opened three years later.

Before the 1923 Grouping the lines over which the service operates were owned by:
 Leeds – Methley: Midland Railway (MidR)
 Methley – Pontefract (Monkhill) – Goole: L&YR 
 Wakefield Westgate station was joint GNR)/L&YR
 Wakefield – Pontefract (Monkhill): L&YR

Description of route

Leeds–Goole

Trains using the Pontefract line from Leeds use the same route as the Hallam line to Methley Junction:
 
 here is Methley Junction, where lines of the MidR, L&YR and the Great Northern Railway (GNR) converged.
  (also on the Hallam line and Huddersfield line)
  (opened 21 February 2005)
 : junction with Wakefield line
 : joint L&YR/GNR station. The Dearne Valley line has a junction at this point; there is also the Askern branch line for Doncaster
 
 runs under East Coast Main Line
 : junction for the Hull and Barnsley Railway (HBR - now to Drax); and the joint GCR/HBR line crossed the line about a mile further east
 
 
 Oakhills Junction with the Selby–Goole line closed in 1964

Wakefield–Pontefract

The Wakefield service joins the Leeds service at Pontefract; the station served for this section are: 
  (also served by the Wakefield line): the station was jointly owned by GCR and GNR; to the south was the West Riding and Grimsby Joint Railway (also owned by those companies)
  (Previous terminus for most services on this line)
 leaving Wakefield there were a large number of junctions between there and Crofton
 there were two stations on this line serving Crofton and Sharlston 
 
 
 
  where the Leeds line joins

Both services now run hourly to Leeds from Knottingley to provide a combined half-hourly service between Knottingley, Pontefract Monkhill and Leeds

References

External links 

 Pontefract line including map

Rail transport in West Yorkshire
Transport in Leeds
Railway lines in Yorkshire and the Humber